The pearl-spot chromis or spottedfin puller (Chromis notata) is a damselfish of the family Pomacentridae, found in the northwest Pacific from southern Korea, the coast of Jeju Island, southern Japan, the Ryukyu Islands, Taiwan, and China, at depths of between 2 and 15 m.  Its length is up to 17 cm.

References

pearl-spot chromis
Marine fauna of East Asia
pearl-spot chromis